Justin Wells (born January 16, 1988) is an American football guard for the High Country Grizzlies of the National Arena League (NAL).

Background
Wells was born and grew up in Baltimore, Maryland.  He attended Baltimore City Public Schools and graduated in 2006 from the Baltimore Polytechnic Institute. While at Poly he played football and threw the shot on the school's track team.

College career
Wells was the starting right guard and a key member of an offensive that set St. Augustine College's single season records for points (28.3) and total offensive yards (318.5) in 2010. That season, the Falcons won the Pioneer Bowl, defeating nationally ranked Fort Valley State 20-9. It was the first bowl win in school history.

Inn 2010, Wells was selected to play in two postseason all-star games: the Dixie Gridiron Classic and HBCU Classic.

Wells graduated with a degree in political science from St. Augustine's University.

Professional career

Carolina Panthers
On August 8, 2012, Wells was signed by the Carolina Panthers. On August 24, 2013, he was waived by the Panthers.

Arizona Rattlers
On October 2, 2013, Wells was assigned to the Arizona Rattlers of the Arena Football League.

Orlando Predators
On January 16, 2014, Wells was traded to the Orlando Predators, along with 3 other players, for Quinn Pitcock.

Las Vegas Outlaws
On March 27, 2015, Wells was assigned to the Las Vegas Outlaws. He was placed on reassignment on July 15, 2015. On July 17, 2015, Wells was again assigned to the Outlaws.

Philadelphia Soul
On February 20, 2017, Wells was assigned to the Philadelphia Soul. On May 1, 2017, Wells was placed on recallable reassignment.

References

1988 births
Living people
American football offensive guards
Arizona Rattlers players
Carolina Panthers players
Edmonton Elks players
Orlando Predators players
Las Vegas Outlaws (arena football) players
Philadelphia Soul players
High Country Grizzlies players
Players of American football from Baltimore